Bar 51 (Hebrew: בר 51) is an Israeli independent underground dramatic art film directed by Amos Guttman and cowritten with  and .

Plot
The film deals with Thomas's incestuous love for his sister, Mariana: After they arrive together in Tel Aviv-Yafo, after escaping from Migdal HaEmek due to the death of their Christian mother, Ewa, and setting up housekeeping in the sleazy side of town, Thomas makes his money as "kept man" for two different women who are nightclub entertainers at a bar filled with homosexual, deformed, and inebriated workers, Luna and Zara a.k.a. Sarah Azulay. He first attempts to work at a hotel yet is fired upon being caught stealing supplies for Mariana and has to resort to a dirty shelter. At the same time, he attracts the attentions of an amorous transvestite prostitute and stripper (“Ada Valerie-Tal” i.e. Sergiu Valerie) calling himself "Apolonia Goldstein" (a character based on Gila Goldstein who performed in a real-life bar called Bar 51) who allows the siblings to live at his apartment. His unnatural love for his sister goes unexpressed, however, his jealousy cannot be controlled. If his sister wants to lead any sort of a normal life, it will be up to her to break her dependence on her brother and move on. The film ends with Thomas violently raping Mariana, following by her killing him.

Cast
Juliano Mer-Khamis as Thomas
 as Mariana
 as Ewa
Belinka Metzner as Luna
 as Zara
Alon Abutbul as Aranjuez
Mosko Alkalai as Karl
David Wilson as Aaron

Reception
Journalist  favorably compared this film to the works of Rainer Werner Fassbinder and Martin Scorsese, journalist  blasted the film for its lack of "style" though he nonetheless called it one of the great Israeli films of the 1980s, while journalist Daniel Warth also noted the similarities to Fassbinder and Pier Paolo Pasolini, yet claimed that these remained on the surface only, as this film lacked a "message". Nevertheless, more recently, it came out as the 30th best Israeli film out of 40 listed in a poll of critics conducted by Maariv, and also received two votes (Marat Parkhomovsky and ) in a similar 2018 survey of critics. The film, whose budget was said to be the equivalent of $400,000, was awarded several prizes by the Israeli Ministry of Economy and was screened at Chicago International Film Festival, despite being a commercial failure with only 32,000 tickets sold. A main character in Guttman's 1992 film Amazing Grace is also called Thomas, probably as homage to this film. A restaurant named after this film has opened in Tel Aviv-Yafo in 2019.

References

External links

 ( [Alternative Entry])

1980s Hebrew-language films
1980s English-language films
1980s dance films
1986 independent films
1986 drama films
1986 LGBT-related films
1986 multilingual films
Israeli drama films
Israeli independent films
Israeli LGBT-related films
Israeli multilingual films
LGBT-related drama films
Gay-related films
Films directed by Amos Guttman
Films about Christianity
Films about entertainers
Films about homelessness
Films about male prostitution
Films about murderers
Films about prostitution in Israel
Films about striptease
Films about rape
Films about siblings
Films about violence against women
Cross-dressing in film
Incest in film
Fratricide in fiction
Cultural depictions of activists
Cultural depictions of actors
Cultural depictions of Israeli people
Cultural depictions of musicians
Cultural depictions of transgender people
Films set in hotels
Films set in Tel Aviv
Films shot in Israel